Vol. 2: Vintage (a.k.a. The Official Jay Dee Instrumental Series Vol. 2: Vintage) is an instrumental EP by producer Jay Dee (also known as J Dilla).  The EP features unreleased tracks compiled from the period 1995–1998.  These beats may represent his simpler work, before he entered his more experimental phase, but still contain his trademark heavy filtering, syncopated basslines, and lo-fi sonics.

Track listing 
"It's Dope"
"Kamaal"
"Doo Doo"
"The Skip"
"Get Down"
"Dreamy"
"Coastin'"
"The Dee"
"Earl"
"On the 1"
"Circus"
"Grannie"
"Trashy"

External links 
Bling 47

2003 EPs
J Dilla EPs
Instrumental albums
Albums produced by J Dilla
Sequel albums